Ahmad Kamil bin Jaafar (27 August 1937 – 3 April 2021) was a Malaysian politician and diplomat.

Biography
Jaafar was born in the Kulim District and attended Malay College Kuala Kangsar and the University of Malaya. He served as Secretary General of the Ministry of Foreign Affairs from April 1989 to August 1996 and was Ambassador of Malaysia to Switzerland, China, Japan, and Thailand. He was then the Prime Minister's Special Envoy to the Non-Aligned Movement, where he was highly respected due to his English language proficiency.

On 30 March 2011, an exhibition of paintings by Malaysian ambassadors was displayed at the National Visual Arts Gallery in Kuala Lumpur, which included works owned by Jaafar.

Death
Ahmad Kamil Jaafar died on 3 April 2021 at the age of 83.

Honours
 :
 Officer of the Order of the Defender of the Realm (KMN) (1975)
 Companion of the Order of the Defender of the Realm (JMN) (1980)
 Commander of the Order of Loyalty to the Royal Family of Malaysia (PSD) - Datuk (1989)
 Commander of the Order of Loyalty to the Crown of Malaysia (PSM) - Tan Sri (1992)
 :
 Knight of the Order of Cura Si Manja Kini (DPCM) - Dato’ (1982)
 :
 Knight Companion of the Order of Loyalty to the Royal House of Kedah (DSDK) - Dato’ (1988)

Foreign Honours
 :
 Order of the White Elephant (1998)
 :
 Grand Cordon of the Order of the Rising Sun (1998)
 :
 Commander of the Ordre national du Mérite (1998)
 Commander of the Legion of Honour (1999)

References

1937 births
2021 deaths
Malaysian politicians
Malaysian diplomats
Ambassadors of Malaysia to Switzerland
Ambassadors of Malaysia to China
Ambassadors of Malaysia to Japan
Ambassadors of Malaysia to Thailand
Grand Cordons of the Order of the Rising Sun
Commanders of the Ordre national du Mérite
Commandeurs of the Légion d'honneur
University of Malaya alumni
People from Kedah
Officers of the Order of the Defender of the Realm
Companions of the Order of the Defender of the Realm
Commanders of the Order of Loyalty to the Royal Family of Malaysia
Commanders of the Order of Loyalty to the Crown of Malaysia